Paunch may refer to:
 The rumen, the larger part of the reticulorumen, the first chamber in the digestive tract of ruminant animals
 The abdomen of someone suffering from central obesity